Batang may refer to:

Places

China
A Chinese county
 Batang County (巴塘县), a county in Garzê Tibetan Autonomous Prefecture, Sichuan

Chinese towns
 Batang, Sichuan (巴塘镇), the seat of Batang County, Sichuan
 Batang, Guangxi (八塘镇), a town in Gangnan District, Guigang, Guangxi
 Batang, Ningxiang (坝塘镇), a town of Ningxiang City, Hunan

Chinese township
 Batang Township (巴塘乡), a township of Yushu County, Qinghai

Chinese rivers
 Batang River, Qinghai (巴塘河), a tributary of the Tongtian River in Qinghai
 Batang River, Sichuan (巴塘河), a tributary of the Jinsha River in Sichuan

Southeast Asia
 Batang Regency, regency in Central Java province, Indonesia
 Batang, Batang, capital of Batang Regency
 Batang, one of the 28 barangays of Irosin, Sorsogon, Philippines

Others
 Batang, a type of typeface that means "Background" in Korean; see Ming (typeface)